That's My Amboy (International title: My Superstar) is a 2016 Philippine television drama romance comedy series broadcast by GMA Network. Directed by Dominic Zapata and Joyce E. Bernal, it stars Barbie Forteza and Andre Paras. It premiered on January 25, 2016 on the network's Telebabad line up replacing Because of You. The series concluded on April 29, 2016 with a total of 68 episodes. It was replaced by Once Again in its timeslot.

The series is streaming online on YouTube.

Premise
Bryan, an actor is the reason why Maru's stepfather got into an accident. To pay for the damages, Bryan's manager hires Maru to be Bryan's personal assistant. The two don't get along at first but eventually they will become friends and fall for each other.

Cast and characters

Lead cast
 Barbie Forteza as Maria Rosario "Maru" Carreon Tapang / Romero
 Andre Paras as Bryan Ford

Supporting cast
 Tonton Gutierrez as Albert Romero
 John Arcilla as Joselito "Lito" Tapang
 Donita Rose as Cecille Carreon-Tapang
 Kiko Estrada as Patrick "Kitoy" Almeda
 Jazz Ocampo as Trina Dominguez
 Matet de Leon as Yaya Yolly
 Meryll Soriano as Divine "Ms. D"
 Maritoni Fernandez as Alicia Ford
 Pauline Mendoza as Maria Carmela "Maricar" Carreon Tapang
 Kryshee Grengia as Maria Theresa "Mayte" Carreon Tapang
 Pam Prinster as Miley Vergara
 Philip Lazaro as PR

Guest cast
 Jaclyn Jose as Mrs. Ventura
 Alden Richards as himself
 Rhian Ramos as herself
 Gina Alajar as herself
 Tina Paner as Kelly
 Thea Tolentino as Lynette
 Regine Tolentino as host
 Lovely Rivero as herself
 Debraliz as Linda
 Carmen Soriano as Stella
 Princess Guevarra as Celine
 Mega Unciano as Diego
 Janna Dominguez as Christine
 Orosa Jacinto as Julianna "Jill" Ford
 Diva Montelaba as Rebecca "Becky" Almeda
 Rez Cortez as Jun
 Renz Valerio as Marky
 Cheska Diaz as Lolita Carreon
 Mayton Eugenio as Melissa "Isa" Carreon
 Carmi Martin as Maria Gregoria "Marissa" Tapang-Santos
 Manny Castañeda as Direk

Ratings
According to AGB Nielsen Philippines' Mega Manila household television ratings, the pilot episode of That's My Amboy earned a 21.5% rating. While the final episode scored a 20.5% rating.

References

External links
 
 

2016 Philippine television series debuts
2016 Philippine television series endings
Filipino-language television shows
GMA Network drama series
Philippine romantic comedy television series
Television shows set in Quezon City